"Candy Says" is a song written by Lou Reed. The song is the first track on the Velvet Underground's self-titled third album. It is one of four songs Lou Reed explicitly wrote in the voice of a female character, in the case of "Candy Says", a transgender woman, telling her experiences. Each would begin with the woman's name and then be followed by the verb "says". "Stephanie Says" was the first (later adapted into "Caroline Says" on his solo album Berlin).

The song addresses Candy Darling's desire to escape her birth gender. Lou Reed insisted that Doug Yule take the lead vocal on the song.

Lou Reed said the song was also "about something more profound and universal, a universal feeling I think all of us have at some point. We look in the mirror and we don't like what we see...I don't know a person alive who doesn't feel that way."

Alternate versions 
 1970: On the live album Live at Max's Kansas City
 1972: On the live album Le Bataclan '72
 2003: Anohni on Reeds live album Animal Serenade
 In 2005, Lou Reed joined Antony and the Johnsons for a rendition of "Candy Says" on stage at Ahnoni's Carnegie Hall show. 
 2006: Anohni and Reed on his live album Berlin: Live At St. Ann's Warehouse
 Reed's last public performance, seven months before his death in October 2013, was also "Candy Says" with Antony and the Johnsons, this time in Paris on March 6 of that year.

In popular culture 
Anohni's 2003 live version of the song was featured in the 2022 interactive film video game Immortality.

References

1969 songs
Songs written by Lou Reed
The Velvet Underground songs
Transgender-related songs
LGBT-related songs